Elektrac is a live album by British electronic musician Squarepusher's live group Shobaleader One. It was released on 10 March 2017 on Warp Records.

Track listing

Charts

References

2017 albums
Squarepusher albums
Warp (record label) albums